Augustin Gabriel d'Aboville (20 March 1773 – 15 August 1820) was a French general de brigade (brigadier general). He was the older brother of Augustin-Marie d'Aboville. He was born in La Fère, Aisne, Picardy. He participated in the Battle of Stockach (1799), Battle of Corunna, Battle of Talavera and the Battle of Vitoria. He was made a knight of the Order of Saint Louis and a commander in the Legion of Honour (awarded 23 June 1810). Under the First French Empire, he was made a baron by emperor Napoleon on 20 February 1812. After the Bourbon Restoration, he served in the Chamber of Peers.

References 
 https://sites.google.com/site/laferesyndinit/

External links
 

1773 births
1820 deaths
Burials at Père Lachaise Cemetery
Knights of the Order of Saint Louis
Commandeurs of the Légion d'honneur
Barons of the First French Empire
Members of the Chamber of Peers of the Bourbon Restoration
People from La Fère
Names inscribed under the Arc de Triomphe